Shaun Byrne (born 9 June 1993) is a Scottish footballer who plays as a midfielder for Dundee.

Byrne started his career as a youth player for Celtic, before moving to Dunfermline Athletic where he made over 100 competitive appearances. He then played for Livingston for three seasons.

Career

Dunfermline Athletic 
Byrne joined Dunfermline Athletic in 2008, after playing at youth level with Celtic. After playing youth team football for his first few season with the club, Byrne made his first team debut in 2012 in the Scottish League Cup, coming on as a substitute for Ryan Wallace in the 3–0 defeat of Montrose. His first league appearance came again as a substitute, this time against Dumbarton in a 2–0 victory at The Bet Butler Stadium, whilst his first start for The Pars came in a New Years Fife derby against Raith Rovers.

Byrne scored his first goal for the club in a 2–3 defeat against Arbroath during the 2013–14 season. After winning the Scottish League One title and with his contract ending, Byrne was released by the Pars at the end of the 2015–16 season.

Livingston 
Shortly after his release by Dunfermline, Byrne signed for recently relegated Scottish League One side Livingston. Byrne was a regular  for the club as they gained consecutive promotions in the following two years. After going on to win what would be his second consecutive League One title with ease, the Lions would earn promotion to the Scottish Premiership the following year, defeating Partick Thistle in the Premiership play-offs in 2017–18, having finishing second in the Championship. He turned down a move away from the club in summer 2018.

Dundee 
In June 2019, Byrne signed for Dundee on a three-year deal with an option of another year for an undisclosed fee. In May 2021 Byrne won the Premiership play-offs with Dundee, earning promotion to the Premiership. On 16 October, Byrne suffered ligament damage in his knee during a 2–1 win at home to Aberdeen. Although having been able to avoid surgery, his timescale for recovery was set between six and twelve weeks. In January 2022, after returning to the training pitch, Byrne signed a contract extension that would keep him at Dundee until 2024. That same month, Byrne would make his return to the pitch in a Scottish Cup victory over Dumbarton.

Despite being allowed to leave the team by new manager Gary Bowyer, Byrne would fight to earn his place back, and received a large ovation from a supportive Dundee fanbase as he came on as a substitute in a league win over Raith Rovers in November 2022. The following week, Byrne would notch his 100th competitive appearance for Dundee in another home win against Hamilton Academical.

Career statistics

Honours

Club
Dunfermline Athletic
Scottish League One: 2015–16

Livingston
Scottish League One: 2016–17

References

External links

1993 births
Living people
Scottish footballers
Celtic F.C. players
Dunfermline Athletic F.C. players
Livingston F.C. players
Dundee F.C. players
Scottish Football League players
Scottish Professional Football League players
Association football midfielders